Onllwyn is a small village and community in Neath Port Talbot, Wales, near Seven Sisters. The community area also covers the small settlements of Dyffryn Cellwen and Banwen To the north is Coelbren, Powys, while to the east the Afon Pyrddin forms the boundaries of both Powys and the Brecon Beacons National Park.

History

First developed by the Romans, the local village Banwen sits astride the Roman Road of Sarn Helen. There are two Roman forts and the remains of a further Roman Road within the community. 

Local tradition has it that St Patrick was born here and taken prisoner to Ireland by Irish raiders. A memorial stone in Banwen is the focus of celebrations and marches held on March 17 to mark the event.

With over 200 years of coal mining behind it, the parish once had five pits that employed hundreds of men. Now all that remains is a coal washery and coal processing plant. On the route of the former Neath and Brecon Railway, there was a freight only line to the coal washery from the South Wales Main Line at Neath. The site of the coal washery (and the nearby Nant Helen surface mine), is being redeveloped as the Global Centre of Rail Excellence.

Onllwyn was involved in several 20th-century coal mining strikes which brought the town notoriety. The political, labour and cultural connections between Onllwyn and the American coal mining region known as Appalachia grew into an in-person cultural exchange in the 1970s. Musical acts were performed at Onllwyn Miners' Welfare Hall in 1976, including a performance by The Strange Creek Singers featuring American musicians Hazel Dickens, Alice Gerrard, Mike Seeger, Tracy Schwartz, and Lamar Grier. The exchange was facilitated and filmed by Helen Lewis and John Gaventa.

Onllwyn was also the setting for Pride, the award-winning 2014 LGBT-related historical comedy-drama film written by Stephen Beresford and directed by Matthew Warchus. The movie chronicles the true story of a group of lesbian and gay activists who raised money to help families affected by the British miners' strike in 1984.

Present
Commanding views of the Brecon Beacons, this now semi-rural location is popular for retired people. There is a Community College, "Dove Workshops", village shop, post office, pub, and Association football and Rugby union teams.

Government and politics
Onllwyn is in the parliamentary constituency of Neath.

Following a 2020 boundary review by the Local Democracy and Boundary Commission for Wales, Onllwyn was joined by the neighbouring communities of Crynant and Seven Sisters to become 'Crynant, Onllwyn and Seven Sisters' electoral ward, effective from the 2022 local elections. Two councillors are elected to Neath Port Talbot County Borough Council.

The former ward of Onllwyn consisted of some or all of the following settlements: Banwen, Dyffryn Cellwen and Onllwyn.

Onllwyn was bounded by the wards of Abercraf and Tawe Uchaf (both in Powys) to the north; Glynneath to the southeast; and Seven Sisters to the south west. 

In the 2017 local council elections, the electorate turnout was 42%.  The results were:

Residents of note
 Dai Francis, NUM trade unionist and father of MP David Hywel Francis, was born in Onllwyn, and took as his bardic name "Dai o'r Onllwyn"

References

External links
Cwmdulais Historical Society
www.geograph.co.uk : photos of Onllwyn and surrounding area

Further reading
 Tom Hansell, Patricia Beaver and Angela Wiley, "Keep Your Eye upon the Scale," http://southernspaces.org/2015/keep-your-eye-upon-scale

Villages in Neath Port Talbot
Communities in Neath Port Talbot
Former wards of Neath Port Talbot
Dulais Valley